McLean or Maclean is a surname.

McLean or Maclean may also refer to:

Places

Australia
Maclean, New South Wales
Maclean, Queensland (disambiguation)
 North Maclean, Queensland
 South Maclean, Queensland
Maclean Island, Tasmania

Canada
McLean, Saskatchewan
McLean Island (Nunavut)

United States
McLean, Illinois
McLean, Nebraska
McLean, Ohio
McLean, Texas
McLean, Virginia
McLean (WMATA station), a Washington Metro station in McLean
McLean, West Virginia
McLean County (disambiguation)

Other uses 
 McLean Group of Companies, a North American real estate and film company
 Clan Maclean, Scottish clan
 McLean Hospital, psychiatric hospital, in Belmont, Massachusetts, USA
 McLean Deluxe, low fat hamburger once sold by McDonald's restaurants
 Maclean's, is Canada's only national weekly current affairs magazine
 McLean v. Arkansas, US Supreme Court case regarding church-state separation
 McLean High School, a school in McLean, Virginia
 Macleans (toothpaste), a brand of toothpaste distributed by GlaxoSmithKline

See also
 Clan Maclean
 McLean school
 McClean (disambiguation)
 McClain (disambiguation)
 Macklin (disambiguation)
 McLane (disambiguation)